Ahmed Kahil (Arabic:أحمد كحيل) (born 15 March 1985) is a Qatari footballer plays for Al-Kharaitiyat as a right back.

External links

References

Qatari footballers
1985 births
Living people
El Jaish SC players
Al Kharaitiyat SC players
Al-Wakrah SC players
Qatar Stars League players
Qatari Second Division players
Association football wingers
Association football fullbacks